Kevin James Custer is a television, film, commercial and multi media producer and director. Kevin has produced, directed, and/or edited projects for clients that include MTV, BET, FUSE, Sony, DefJam, E1, The Clinton Global Initiative, The United Nations, UNICEF, P&G, Ford, Disney, Discovery Channel, Animal Planet, and more.

Prior to his film career, Kevin earned an MBA in finance and spent 8 years with management consulting firm McKinsey & Company where he designed international investment strategies & compensation models; financial risk/leverage models; foreign exchange/hedging strategies; global (multi-user, multi-bank, multi-currency) Treasury system.

Documentary films directed and/or edited
Finding The Funk – Director Nelson George, Editor Kevin J Custer - Featuring Questlove, Mike D, Bootsy Collins, Sly Stone, and more
Apocalyptica - "Theme And Variations" – Director & Editor Kevin J Custer - Featuring Lars Ulrich, Corey Taylor, Max Cavalera, Michael Monroe, and more
30 for 30 – Director Nelson George, Editor Kevin J Custer - Featuring Walt "Clyde" Frazier
Slayer - "25 Years Later - Madison Square Garden" – Director & Editor Kevin J Custer - 25 years after the show that destroyed The Felt Forum in NYC (MSG), Slayer returns to the Garden to perform and recount that epic night.
MOOGFEST – Director Kevin J Custer - Live at BB Kings, NYC featuring Jan Hammer, Keith Emerson, Bernie Worrell and more

Television / web series directed and/or edited
 Discovery Channel - Shark Week 40th Anniversary
 Animal Planet - Meet The Irwins / Wild Times
 MTV Unplugged - Rita Ora 
 MTV Unplugged - Walk The Moon 
 MTV Headbangers Ball - Scandinavia - full season 
 Disney - That's Fresh with Helen Cavalo - full season 
 The Clinton Global Initiative 2010, 2011, 2012, 2013, 2015
 BET 2011 Black History Month spots

Branded Content directed / edited
 Ford Motor Company
 Canon
 Weight Watchers
 P&G
 Disney
 Grand Cru
 Pampers
 Nicole Miller
 Hurley

Music videos directed and edited
 36 Crazyfists – "Swing the Noose"
 Alanis Morissette & Souleye – "Jekyll & Hyde"
 Anaka – "Deathborn"
 Anaka – "Erase"
 Angélique Kidjo – "You Can Count on Me"
 Angélique Kidjo f/Aṣa – "Eva"
 Angélique Kidjo f/John Legend & Bono – "Move on Up"
 Before the Mourning – "Another Sleepless Night"
 Beneath the Massacre – "Society's Disposable Son"
 Big Noyd – "Things Done Changed"
 Black Tusk – "Red Eyes, Black Skies"
 Cannibal Corpse – "Priests of Sodom"
 Chuck Ragan – "Non Typical"
 Dark Sermon – "Hounds"
 Decyfer Down – "Fight Like This"
 DJ Webstar & Jim Jones – "Dancin on Me"
 Fair to Midland – "Musical Chairs"
 Fake Problems – "Soulless"
 Hatebreed – "Ghosts of War"
 Hatebreed – "Thirsty and Miserable"
 High on Fire – "Frost Hammer"
 Highly Suspect – "Mom"
 Hunter Valentine – "Liar Liar"
 Kingdom of Sorrow – "Lead into Demise"
 Lacuna Coil – "I Like It"
 Last Chance to Reason – "SBTBATAC"
 Legion – "AndThen The Devil Said..."
 Ligeia – "Beyond a Doubt"
 Madball – "Infiltrate the System"
 Method Man & Redman – "Mrs. International"
 Miss Fortune – "Chasing Dreams"
 Overkill – "Bitter Pill"
 Overkill – "The Armorist"
 Overkill – "Bring Me the Night"
 Overkill – "Electric Rattlesnake"
 Saving Abel – "Bringing Down The Giant"
 Shadows Fall – "The Unknown"
 Soulja Boy – "Donk"
 Sparks the Rescue – "Autumn"
 Subzero – "Lionhearted"
 System Divide – "The Apex Doctrine"
 Tesla – "So Divine"
 The Destro – "Beast Burden"
 The Gaslight Anthem – "American Slang"
 The Gaslight Anthem – "Great Expectations"
 The Gaslight Anthem – "The '59 Sound"
 The Horrible Crowes – "Behold the Hurricane"
 The Horrible Crowes – "Ladykiller"
 The Killing Gift – "Self Medicated"
 The Reverend Peyton's Big Damn Band – "Angels Look Like Devils"
 The Reverend Peyton's Big Damn Band – "Pot Roast and Kisses"
 The Reverend Peyton's Big Damn Band – "Raise a Little Hell"
 The Reverend Peyton's Big Damn Band – "Something For Nothing"
 The Reverend Peyton's Big Damn Band – "Clap Your Hands"
 The So So Glos – "Diss Town"
 The Stick People – "My Everything"
 Title Fight – "Shed"
 Tombs – "Gossamer"
 Too Late the Hero – "SCAIF"
 Within the Ruins – "Calling Card"
 Within the Ruins – "Feeding Frenzy"
 Within the Ruins – "Gods Amongst Men"
 Within the Ruins – "New Holy War"

Live concert DVDs directed and edited
Overkill – Live In Overhausen - DVD
The Horrible Crowes – Live at the Troubadour, LA - DVD
Flogging Molly – Live at The Greek Theater - DVD
Hatebreed – Live Dominance - DVD

Music videos edited
The Sounds – "Yeah Yeah Yeah"
The Sounds – "The No No Song"
Gym Class Heroes – "Index Down"
Hatebreed – "In Ashes They Shall Reap"
Jeremy Greene featuring Pitbull – "Rain"
Jim Jones – "Blow the Bank"
Jim Jones – "Nana na na Nana"
Jim Jones – "Pop Champaigne"
Justin Bieber & Usher – "One Time"
Ray J – "Gifts"
Straight Line Stitch – "Remission"
Straight Line Stitch – "Black Veil"
Testament – "More Than Meets the Eye"
The Warriors – "Destroying Cenodoxus"
Threat Signal – "Through My Eyes"
Unk – "Show Out"
Willie the Kid f/ Trey Songz – "Love for Money"

References

External links
 HuffPost Video Debut: Angelique Kidjo with Fela!, Plus Los Lobos, Daryl Hall & John Oates, and A Conversation With Darrell Scott
 Angelique Kidjo sings out for a fair and ambitious climate deal in Copenhagen
 Renowned Music Video Director to Speak at USA
 Fair To Midland To Film New Music Video
 A Conversation with Vocalist Adam Warren by Chad Bowar
 Black Tusk Debuts RedEyes,Black Skies Video
 Overkill to re-release new CD/DVD with three unreleased live tracks

Living people
American music video directors
Advertising directors
1978 births